Kevin Alfred Eveleigh (born 8 November 1947) is a former New Zealand rugby union player. A flanker, Eveleigh represented Manawatu and Bay of Plenty at a provincial level, and was a member of the New Zealand national side, the All Blacks, from 1974 to 1977. He played 30 matches for the All Blacks including four internationals. He later captained Rhodesia between 1979 and 1980, and was the coach of Manawatu in 1987. In 1988, he was one of the first two "celebrity entries"—alongside Brian Ford—at the annual Coast to Coast adventure race.

References

1947 births
Living people
Rugby union players from Palmerston North
People educated at Ōtorohanga College
New Zealand rugby union players
New Zealand international rugby union players
Manawatu rugby union players
Bay of Plenty rugby union players
Rhodesian rugby union players
Rugby union flankers
New Zealand rugby union coaches